Nigel Marcus Baker  (born 9 September 1966) is a British diplomat, who was formerly Ambassador to Bolivia and Ambassador to the Holy See. He was Head of the Latin America department at the Foreign and Commonwealth Office from 2016 to 2019, and in August 2020 took up his appointment as British Ambassador to Slovakia.

Early life and education
Baker was born on 9 September 1966. He educated at Dulwich College, an all-boys private boarding school in London. He studied history at Gonville and Caius College, Cambridge, graduating with a first class honours Bachelor of Arts (BA) degree in 1988: as per tradition, his BA was promoted to a Master of Arts (MA Cantab) in 1992.

Career

After a brief period as researcher in the Conservative Research Department he joined the Foreign and Commonwealth Office (FCO) in 1989. After early overseas postings in Prague and Bratislava he took a research sabbatical in Verona (from 1996–97) studying Italian and European history.

Returning to the FCO, he was Head of the European Defence Section in the Security Policy Department between 1998–2000. He was then assistant Private Secretary to the Prince of Wales 2000–03, Deputy Head of Mission, Havana, 2003–06 and Ambassador to Bolivia 2007–11 before being appointed to the Holy See. He presented his credentials to Pope Benedict XVI on 9 September 2011. In 2016, he returned to the FCO as Deputy Director for the Americas and Head of the South America Department. He became Deputy Director and Head of the Latin America Department in 2018.

Baker was appointed MVO in 2003 for services to the Prince of Wales, and OBE in 2010.

In 2013 he edited Britain and the Holy See: A Celebration of 1982 and the Wider Relationship, which set out the proceedings of the 2012 Rome Colloquium on the relationship between Britain and the Holy See. Contributors include Professor Eamon Duffy, Professor Judith Champ, Cardinal Vincent Nichols, Cardinal Keith Patrick O'Brien, and Cardinal Cormac Murphy-O'Connor.

In August 2020 he became Ambassador to Slovakia, succeeding Andrew Garth.

Notes

References
 BAKER, Nigel Marcus, Who's Who 2012, A & C Black, 2012; online edn, Oxford University Press, Dec 2011, accessed 19 March 2012
 Change of Her Majesty’s Ambassador to the Holy See, Foreign & Commonwealth Office, 15 April 2011 
 Our Ambassador, British Embassy to the Holy See
 Nigel Baker is ambassador to the Holy See, The Telegraph, London, 15 Apr 2011

 

 

 

1966 births
Living people
People educated at Dulwich College
Alumni of Gonville and Caius College, Cambridge
Ambassadors of the United Kingdom to Bolivia
Ambassadors of the United Kingdom to the Holy See
Ambassadors of the United Kingdom to Slovakia
Officers of the Order of the British Empire
Members of the Royal Victorian Order